The Botswana women's cricket team toured Namibia in March–April 2019 to play a five-match Women's Twenty20 International (WT20I) series. The venue for all of the matches was the United Ground in Windhoek. The tournament provided Namibia with some preparation for the 2019 ICC Women's Qualifier Africa. Both matches due to be played on the first day of the series (31 March) were abandoned without a toss due to rain, and rescheduled for the reserve day (2 April), with the series listed in Cricinfo as a seven-match series. Namibia won the series 5–0.

WT20I series

1st WT20I

2nd WT20I

3rd WT20I

4th WT20I

5th WT20I

6th WT20I

7th WT20I

References

External links
 Series home at ESPN Cricinfo

Cricket in Namibia
Cricket in Botswana
International cricket competitions in 2018–19